is a Japanese actress, singer-songwriter, tarento and gravure idol.

As an actress, tarento and gravure idol Sasaki is represented with Cel World Entertainment.

As a singer-songwriter she is represented with Ongaku Koubou You.

Filmography
Entries in bold text are her main works

Films

Stage

Dramas

Television

Radio

Advertisements

Works

DVD/Blu-ray
 Films, dramas, direct-to-video
Entries in bold text are her main works

 Image videos

CD

Distribution

Bibliography

Photo albums

Talk collections

References

External links
 – affiliated office 
 – Ameba Blog 
 
 – Ameba Blog 
 – affiliated office (CO906.) 
 

Japanese gravure idols
Japanese female adult models
Japanese television personalities
21st-century Japanese actresses
Japanese women singer-songwriters
Japanese singer-songwriters
Singers from Tokyo
1990 births
Living people
21st-century Japanese singers
21st-century Japanese women singers